Vincent "Vinny" Corey is a Gaelic football manager and player. He plays for Clontibret O'Neills and has been manager of the Monaghan county team since 2022.

Career
Corey played at senior level for his county for 17 years, winning two Ulster Senior Football Championship (SFC) medals. Corey made his Ulster SFC debut for Monaghan against Armagh in 2003. He outlasted everyone who played in that game, except for an Armagh minor called Charlie Vernon, and is married to Joanne and they have children. He was captain in 2009. But he was not involved in the 2010 Ulster SFC final and he sat out 2011. He was part of the Match for Michaela.

Corey started the 2018 All-Ireland Senior Football Championship semi-final for Monaghan. In 2020 he stated that he had not ruled out a return to Monaghan.

Corey became a selector with Monaghan. He then became manager of the team, replacing Séamus McEnaney in 2022.

References

Year of birth missing (living people)
Living people
Gaelic football managers
Gaelic football selectors
Monaghan inter-county Gaelic footballers